The following lists events that happened during 2015 in the Republic of Mozambique.

Events

January
 January 10 - A mass poisoning at a funeral in Mozambique involves beer that was deliberately contaminated with crocodile bile leaving at least 56 dead and 146 hospitalized.
 January 12 - The death toll from the poisoned beer rises to at least 69, with 169 in hospital. Reports also question whether the poison involved was actually crocodile bile; several studies have indicated that the substance is relatively harmless. The competing theory is that the actual poison may have been cardiac glycosides found in local plants.
 January 13 - The death toll from contaminated beer in the Mozambique rises to at least 72.

References

 
2010s in Mozambique
Years of the 21st century in Mozambique
Mozambique
Mozambique